The 1973 NCAA University Division Outdoor Track and Field Championships were contested June 5−9 at the 51st annual NCAA-sanctioned track meet to determine the individual and team national champions of men's collegiate University Division outdoor track and field events in the United States. 

This year's outdoor meet was hosted by Louisiana State University at the Bernie Moore Track Stadium in Baton Rouge. 

UCLA once again topped team standings, winning their third consecutive, and fifth overall, team national title.

Team result 
 Note: Top 10 only
 (H) = Hosts

References

NCAA Men's Outdoor Track and Field Championship
NCAA University Division Track and Field Championships
NCAA
NCAA University Division Track and Field Championships